Maya is the debut album by electronic artist Toby Marks (Banco de Gaia).

Track listing

Special Edition (2011 Digital Release)

20th Anniversary Edition (2014)
3xCD, limited numbered edition of 1500. All tracks mastered/remastered by Toby Marks, November 2013.

References

1994 debut albums
Banco de Gaia albums